Sam Yan station is a Bangkok MRT rapid transit station on the Blue Line, located underground between Sam Yan intersection on Rama IV Road near Chulalongkorn University in Bangkok, Thailand.

Nearby Attractions
 Chulalongkorn University 
 Chamchuri Square (Connected underground)
 Wat Hua Lamphong
 Sam Yan Market
 Bang Rak District Office
 Snake Farm (Queen Saovabha Memorial Institute), Thai Red Cross Society
 Sam Yan Mitrtown (Connected underground)

MRT (Bangkok) stations
Railway stations opened in 2004
2004 establishments in Thailand